Dou dizhu is a card game in the genre of shedding and gambling. It is one of the most popular card games played in China.

Dou dizhu is described as easy to learn but hard to master, requiring mathematical and strategic thinking as well as carefully planned execution. Suits are irrelevant in playing dou dizhu. Players can easily play the game with a set of dou dizhu playing cards, without the suits printed on the cards. Less popular variations of the game do exist in China, such as four-player and five-player dou dizhu played with two packs of cards.

Culture 

The class struggle during the land reform in the 1950s after the Chinese Communist Party took over China encouraged peasants to take up arms against the landlords, hence the name dou dizhu. China's Generation Y, who are among the most enthusiastic player groups, has no personal experience of this specific overt class struggle (compare with the covert contemporary property bubble). Nowadays, the name of the game carries no negative connotation.  The actual place of origin for the game is in Hubei Province.

Objective 

Dou dizhu is played among three people with one pack of cards, including the two differentiated jokers. The game starts with players bidding for the "landlord" position. Those who lose the bid or do not bid enter the game as the "peasants" team competing against the landlord.  The objective of the game is to be the first player to have no cards left. The landlord wins by removing all their cards first. The peasants win if one of them removes all their cards first.

Game play 
A shuffled pack of 54 cards is dealt to three players. Each player is dealt 17 cards, with the last three leftover cards detained on the playing desk, face down.

All players first review and apprise their own cards without showing their cards to the other players. Then, players take turns to bid for the landlord position by telling the other players the risk stake they are willing to accept.

There are three kinds of risk stakes, 1, 2, and 3, with 1 being the lowest and 3 being the highest. Generally, the more confident a player is in the strength of one's cards, the higher the risk stakes one is willing to bid. In most of the online game rooms, the first bidder is chosen randomly by the system. In real life, players usually make up their own rules as to who gets to bid first. For example, some rules stipulate that the player who has the three of hearts is the first bidder. If the three of hearts is in the "kitty" cards, the player who has the four of hearts is the first bidder, and so on.

A player may accept the prior player's bid by passing their turn to bid or one may try to outbid the prior player as long as the prior player did not bet 3 as the risk stake. 
The highest bidder takes the landlord position; the remaining players enter the Farmer team competing against the landlord. The three leftover wild cards are then revealed to all players before being dealt to the landlord.

The landlord wins if he or she has no cards left. The peasant team wins if either of the peasants have no cards left.

Features of the game 
The rules are not complicated; basic knowledge of poker hand rankings helps players get started. However, many of Dou Dizhus rules are different from Poker and Big Two.

There is an element of luck involved, but what counts is not only luck but also skill of playing and strategy. Poor players with great cards may be defeated by skillful players with poor cards.

 Rules 

A few fundamental and exceptive rules are essential for understanding the game play of the game. Some rules are structured differently from the other popular card games. Players who have prior experience with other card games, such as poker, and Big Two, often prejudice the rules.

 Individual cards are ranked. Colored Joker > Black & White Joker > 2 > Ace (A) > King (K) > Queen (Q) > Jack (J) > 10 > 9 > 8 > 7 > 6 > 5 > 4 > 3.
 Suits are irrelevant. Players can play the game with all the suits erased from the cards.

 The Rocket and the Bomb 

The Rocket and the Bomb are groups of cards that work differently in terms of game play.

Category of hands
The game uses the concept of hands, similar to the hands in poker, except there are more variations and not necessarily consisted of only five cards.
 Compare only the same Category. A player can only beat the prior hand using of the same Category but not the others. Note that this means that the ordering of the rows in the following table is not relevant to gameplay.
 Compare only the Chains with the same length. Beat the prior hand using the same number of cards is a basic doctrine which only the Rocket and the Bomb may violate. For example, although both 9-10-J-Q-K and 3-4-5-6-7-8-9 are Single Chains, 9-10-J-Q-K cannot beat 3-4-5-6-7-8-9, nor vice versa.
 Compare the rank in the Primal cards only. The Kicker's rank is irrelevant to the comparison unless a variation with 2+ decks is being played.
 Jokers and 2 are  non-consecutive cards. Colored Joker, black-and-white Joker, and 2 cannot be used in any of the Primal cards of the Chains since they are not traditionally considered as the consecutive cards sequentially next to the Ace. Examples of illegal Chain: 2-3-4-5-6, 2-2-2-3-3-3 w/ A-A-7-7, K-A-2 + B&W Joker + Colored Joker

 Chinese name literal translations 

'Individual card' 
'Hook'  – the jack; the Chinese name is based on the shape of "J"
'Circle'  – the queen, named for the shape of "Q"
'K' The King
'King', 'ruler'  – the joker, named for its dominant position in the game
'One pair'  – two cards of the same rank
'Chain'  or  – five or more consecutively numbered cards
'Pairs chain'  or  – three or more consecutive pairs
'Trio with single card'  – trio, with an individual card as kicker
'Trio with pair'  or  – trio, with a pair as kicker
'Airplane'  or  – two or more consecutive trios
'Airplane with small wings'  – two or more consecutive trios, with additional cards with the same amount of trios as kicker
'Airplane with large wings'  – two or more consecutive trios, with pairs with the same amount of trios as kicker
'Four with two single cards'  – four-of-a-kind, with two individual cards as kicker
'Four with two pairs'  – four-of-a-kind, with two pairs as kicker
'Space shuttle'  – two or more consecutive four-of-a-kind
'Space shuttle with small wings'  – two or more consecutive fours-of-a-kind, with additional cards including the same amount of fours-of-a-kind as kicker
'Space shuttle with large wings'  – two or more consecutive fours-of-a-kind, with pairs with the same amount of fours-of-a-kind as kicker
'Bomb'  – four cards of the same rank

 Illegal play with the kicker 
Beginners and players who are familiar with other card games with similar but different rules of hand formation and superiority often misinterpret some of the rules that involve the kicker, causing illegal play.

 Scoring rules 
The basic mechanism is a betting one; the winner (or winners) take(s) money (points, whatever) from the loser(s). Moreover, the game may be seen as a pair of bets, each one between one of the peasants and the landlord. If the landlord wins, they collect money from each of the peasants, and if the landlord loses, they pay money to each of the peasants.

The bidding (one, two, or three) determines the initial stake, and gameplay can trigger two different categories of multiplier:

 Rocket and/or bomb. Each rocket and bomb dealt by each player doubles the score in a round.
 No deals played a.k.a. spring. If both peasants do not play any cards, or the landlord does not play any cards after their first hand, the round's score is doubled.

 Example 

Consider a round involving players A, B, and C. A passes, B bids 1, C passes, A bids 2, and B and C pass. A is now the landlord, for a base stake of 2 units. Gameplay proceeds, and turns out to include one bomb and a rocket, but all players get to play multiple times. In the end, player C goes out first. The initial stake of 2 is doubled twice (once for each rocket/bomb), so the landlord, A, pays 8 points to the peasants, B and C. Player A will have -16 points, and B and C will have 8 points.

 Basic strategy 
 A player can deal with an unrelated or useless card by making it the kicker card. Rocket and bomb are the ultimate weapons in the game. If they either is in one's hand, one should make full use of it when time comes. If players do not possess high confidence in winning, they may think twice about dealing a rocket or bomb, because once the dealt, the risk stake of the round will be doubled (players will either win or lose double) with each rocket or bomb dealt.
 Peasants must co-operate to fight against the landlord. For example, since the two peasants come after one another, the first peasant might play a low single card if the second peasant has a sole card left.
 Bid high for landlord with the best hand.''' If a player has the best hand, bidding high for the position of landlord enables him to win a bigger pot.

 Variations 

 Four-player 

The four-player version of dou dizhu is played mainly in Zhejiang and Jiangsu provinces, including Shanghai. It uses a double deck, including two red and two black jokers – 108 cards altogether. Each player takes 25 cards and 8 cards are left over for the landlord, who plays alone from a hand of 33 cards against the other three players in partnership.

The combinations that can be played differ from those in the three-player game (listed above), as follows:

 Single card attachments are not permitted
 Nor are there four-with-a-kicker categories
 Bomb: four- or five-of-a-kind
 Rocket: six-of-a-kind
 Missile: seven-of-a-kind
 Sky explosion: eight-of-a-kind 
 Nuke: four jokers (the greatest hand in four-player dou dizhu; can beat anything. If the landlord have the four jokers, he or she could claim for having them. Once claimed for the 4 jokers on hand, the 4 jokers could be used separately. By doing this, the landlord could also choose winning without playing. )

 With wild cards 
Another variation of dou dizhu is the edition with wild cards. Like the original settings, after the determination of the landlord, four-of-a-kind will be randomly selected as wild cards. Those can be used to stand for any other cards, except jokers.

Some games even feature two sets of wild cards. The first set would be drawn before the bid for the landlord, then another one would then be drawn out.

 Tournaments 

In 2005, 117,931 people participated in the dou dizhu online tournament held by GICQ, an online game development and operation company in China.

In 2006, another dou dizhu online tournament, held by VNet.cn, attracted 200,000 players.

In September 2007, YunNanHong held a traditional, offline competition of dou dizhu in Kunming, Yunnan province, where over a hundred players competed for the first prize.Dou dizhu tournaments are held in Chinese cities every year, the winners not only receive high prize but also become popular experts in dou dizhu.

 Popularity Dou dizhu was once just a provincial game in China, originating in the Huangshan District and Anhui. Thanks to the debut of dou dizhu online, the game has become more widespread and is now a national game in China. its popularity increased substantially, with players on one system doubling in two years, from around 50,000 players in December 2002 to 100,000 in 2004
and 17,900,000 players being the loyal fans of the casual game while dou dizhu leading the core place in 2005.
There are almost 1 million concurrent dou dizhu'' players on the Tencent QQ game platform alone.
It is more popular than other Chinese card games like Chinese poker, winner, and big two.

References

External links

Chinese card games
Shedding-type card games
Gambling games
Works about landlords
Climbing games